Jo Bichar Gaye is a Pakistani period drama series based on the book "Bichar Gaye" by Col. Z. I. Farrukh. The series is directed and produced by Haissam Hussain under his banner H2 Films, Mehreen Alam as co-writer for screenplay and written by Ali Moeen. It features Wahaj Ali, Maya Ali and Talha Chahour in leading roles. Set in 1970 and 1971, Jo Bichar Gaye is based on real events from the Bangladesh Liberation War, including the fall of Dhaka. It premiered on Geo Entertainment on 12 December 2021 and airs weekly.

Plot 
The plot revolves around the political conflict between West Pakistan and East Pakistan at the time Liberation of Bangladesh and deals with true events from 1970 to 1971.

Cast 
 Wahaj Ali as  Shafi Imam Rumi
 Maya Ali as Sonia Anwar
 Talha Chahour as Capt.Z.I Farrukh
 Adnan Jaffar as Col A.Fakhruddin
 Nadia Jamil as Shabnam Anwar
 Sajid Shah as Anwarul Haq
 Fazal Hussain as Haroon Anwar
 Rana Majid as Capt. Salahuddin Baig
 Aurangzaib Mirza as Col Aurangzeb
 Ahmed Abbas as Capt. Kabeer Alam
 Umer Darr as Capt. Siddiqui
 Omar Cheema as Shil
 Shizza Khan as Koko Aftab
 Zaheer Taj as Maj. Ghayas ud Din
 Usman Zia as Professor Ajeet
 Fahad Hashmi as Union Leader
 Usama Rehan as Tameez ud Fin
 Shahrule Ali As Sheikh Mujibur Rahman
 Fahad Sokhta as Professor
 Shah Fahad as Politician
 Arsalan Dultana as Politician
 Major Omer Shabbir as Maj. Omer
 Ghulam Hussain as Mohammad Ruhul Amin
 Muneeb Qadir as Jawaharlal Nehru

Episodes

Production

Casting and development
Wahaj revealed in an interview about his upcoming project with Maya. Talha Chahour, a theatre actor makes his television debut with this serial. The serial marks comeback of Nadia Jamil after her cancer recovery.

Location

The shooting of the series took place within Lahore at several locations, mainly Government College University, Punjab University Old Campus, National College of Arts (NCA) and Chamba House, Lahore. A few scenes were filmed in Governor's House, Lahore too.

Language preferences
For this drama Wahaj Ali has learnt Bengali language and accents from his fan Nishat Salsabil Rahman who is originally from Dhaka, Bangladesh; has completed the Master of Pharmacy and professionally a Pharmacist. Her grand father was an Aircraft Engineer of Pakistan International Airlines and posted in West Pakistan from 1948 to 1971.

Release
The first and second teasers were released on 8 December 2021. The series premiered on 12 December 2021.

Reception 
The series received acclaim due to its execution and script.

In a review for Dawn the reviewer praised its unbiased approach comparing it with Hussain's previous historical-period drama stating, "Like Haissam Hussain’s previous work Dastan, which centred on Partition, Jo Bichar Gaye does not indulge in triumphalist patriotism or demonisation." A review for The Express Tribune  noted Wahaj Ali's performance as Rumi. However, the show did not succeed in television ratings or digital ratings but proclaimed a good number of appreciation from the people.

Lux Style Awards

Soundtrack

References 

Pakistani television series
Pakistani television dramas based on novels
2021 Pakistani television series debuts
2022 Pakistani television series endings
Pakistani period television series
Works about the Bangladesh Liberation War